The Auburn United States Post Office is a historic building in Auburn, Nebraska. It was built in 1936–1937, and designed in the Georgian Revival architectural style. Inside, there is a mural by Ethel Magafan, completed in June 1938. The building has been listed on the National Register of Historic Places since May 11, 1992.  It was recorded in the NRIS database as US Post Office-Auburn.

References

Post office buildings on the National Register of Historic Places in Nebraska
National Register of Historic Places in Nemaha County, Nebraska
Georgian Revival architecture in Nebraska
Government buildings completed in 1938
1937 establishments in Nebraska